The women's mass start race of the 2015–16 ISU Speed Skating World Cup 2, arranged in the Utah Olympic Oval, in Salt Lake City, United States, was held on November 22, 2015.

Irene Schouten of the Netherlands won the race, while Ivanie Blondin of Canada came second, and Misaki Oshigiri of Japan came third. Nana Takagi of Japan won the Division B race.

Results

The race took place on Sunday, November 22, with Division B scheduled in the morning session, at 10:43, and Division B scheduled in the afternoon session, at 14:15.

Division A

Division B

References

Women mass start
2
ISU